Michal Vachovec (born July 15, 1992) is a Czech professional ice hockey player who currently plays with KS Cracovia of the Polska Hokej League

References

External links

1992 births
Czech ice hockey forwards
HC Karlovy Vary players
Living people
Sportspeople from Karlovy Vary
Czech expatriate sportspeople in Poland
Expatriate ice hockey players in Poland
Czech expatriate ice hockey people